Miss Granny is a 2018 Filipino musical comedy-drama film based on the South Korean film of the same name. Directed by Joyce E. Bernal, it stars Sarah Geronimo, James Reid, Xian Lim, and Nova Villa. It was released by Viva Films on August 22, 2018, and was nominated for three FAMAS Awards including "Best Actress" for Sarah Geronimo and "Best Original Song" for Isa Pang Araw. It was the second most talked about Filipino film of 2018 on Twitter, The Hows of Us. Geronimo received "Best Actress" trophy at the 35th PMPC Star Awards for Movies, whilst Villa received the "Movie Supporting Actress of the Year" award at the 50th GMMSF Entertainment Box Office Awards. The film is currently available for streaming on Netflix in the Philippines.

Plot
Fely Malabao (Nova Villa), a widow, and her close friend Bert (Boboy Garovillo), who has known Fely since he was a young child, both work in a carinderia. Lulu (Marissa Delgado) regularly makes fun of Fely for being close to Bert. Fely frequently criticizes Angie (Lotlot De Leon), her daughter-in-law, for a variety of reasons such as her cooking and medicinal habits. However, Fely she adores her grandkids, Jeboy (James Reid) and Hana (Ataska Mercado), as well as her son Ramoncito (Nonie Buencamino).

Angie suffers a stress-related collapse one day. Following the doctor's advice to keep Angie's surroundings stress-free, Ramon offers that Fely, Angie's trigger, stay in a nursing home. Fely becomes furious after overhearing the family's conversation, but Jeboy later extends an invitation to lunch. Upon passing the Forever Young Photo Studio on her way to meet him, she runs into a photographer (Jojit Lorenzo) who offers to take a free portrait of her. Later, as she boards a bus, Fely is startled to discover that she has miraculously changed into her younger self (Sarah Geronimo) during a quarrel with other passengers when she notices her reflection in one of the passengers' sunglasses. Fely then assumes the identity of Audrey de Leon while residing in a flat rented out by Bert. Later, she joins her grandson's band as their main singer, shifting their emphasis from metal to love songs.

During one of the band's performances, Audrey performs a song in which she recounts her past. She relocated to Manila to support her son Ramoncito after her husband, a sailor, died while on duty. Ramoncito suffers from a serious illness at one point and is on the verge of passing away until a complete stranger intervenes to save him. A musical talent scout named Lorenz (Xian Lim) approaches Audrey during one of the band's performances and offers the group a chance to break into the mainstream.
In the course of seeking Fely with Ramoncito, Bert initially suspects Audrey of abducting and possibly killing Fely when he comes upon the dentures he gave her as a gift. After a failed attempt by Bert to capture her, Audrey comes clean to Bert, who helps him assure her family that she is doing well and asks for her bank accounts to be unfrozen. Audrey is forced to acknowledge their mortality as elderly people after Lulu passes away. Bert notices that her youthful skin returns to its wrinkled state after she suffers a little cut on her foot before a recording session. Bert attends to the wound, but is challenged by Bert's daughter Minnie (Kim Molina), who orders Audrey to leave the apartment because she believes she is dating her father. She stays at Lorenz's house, where the two of them get along over old music. Lorenz's closeness to Audrey upsets Jeboy, and Audrey suspects that he might be attracted to her romantically. Since Jeboy is unaware that Audrey is his grandma, she rejects him and assaults him when he makes curt remarks, before treating him to a meal as she did when she was Fely.

Lorenz informs the band that they must perform without Jeboy during the Summerslam Concert since he was critically injured after being hit by a car on his way to the stadium. Although Audrey initially objects, she ultimately agrees to play in order to keep Jeboy's band on the bill. Fely chooses to donate blood for Jeboy in the hospital with Bert and Ramoncito, who had realized her identity, despite Bert's warnings that the results might be irreparable. She is told by Ramoncito to leave and lead the life she chooses. They cuddle after Fely decides to stay and choose the life she had led as his mother. Fely then gives blood for her grandchild and returns to her elderly form.

A year later, Fely and her family attend Jeboy's concert with Hana as the band's new lead vocalist. At a bus stop, Fely is approached by a motorbike driven by a young Bert (Sam Concepcion), who encountered the Forever Young Photo Studio. Fely and Bert ride off after he presents her with a bunch of flowers.

Cast
Sarah Geronimo as Audrey de Leon / young Fely
Nova Villa as Feliza "Fely" de Leon-Malabaño
Xian Lim as Lorenz Milleza
James Reid as Jeboy "Jebs" Malabaño
Nonie Buencamino as Ramoncito D. Malabaño
Lotlot de Leon as Angie Malabaño
Boboy Garovillo as Bert
Sam Concepcion as young Bert
Kim Molina as Minnie
Ataska Mercado as Hannah Malabaño
Danita Paner as Phoebe
Marissa Delgado as Lulu Nemenso
Kedebon Colim as Eric
Pio Balbuena as Tim
Angeli Bayani as Olivia
Mara Lopez as Mia
Jojit Lorenzo as the photographer at Forever Young Photo Studio
Arvic Tan as Fely's late husband

Soundtrack

Reception
The film set the record for the highest single day gross for a local movie released in 2018, gaining twenty million pesos on its fifth day of screening. While on its sixth day, the film gained another twenty million pesos. In less than ten days, the film reached the  mark. Domestic gross reached  on its third week.

Awards and nominations

References

External links

2018 films
2018 comedy-drama films
Films directed by Joyce Bernal
Philippine comedy-drama films
Philippine remakes of South Korean films
2010s Tagalog-language films
Viva Films films
CJ Entertainment films
Films about rapid human age change